Polyommatus (Agrodiaetus) fulgens is a species of butterfly in the family Lycaenidae. It is found in the north and north-east of Spain.

The wingspan is about 29 mm. Adults are on wing from July to August.

The larvae feed on Onobrychis viciifolia and other Onobrychis species.

Varieties or forms

 Polyommatus fulgens v. fulgens (north-east Iberian Peninsula, Spain)
 Polyommatus fulgens v. ainsae Forster, 1961 (north Iberian Peninsula, Spain)
Both taxa without geographical separation, continuous distribution.

The taxon P. f. ainsae was treated as a full species by some authors, but molecular studies have concluded that it is the same species as the taxon P. f. fulgens.

Synonyms
Agrodiaetus dolus fulgens de Sagarra, 1925
Agrodiaetus ainsae Forster, 1961
Polyommatus fulgens f. pseudovirgilius (Lesse, 1962)
Agrodiaetus ainsae leonensis Verhulst, 2004

References

 Photos of Polyommatus (Agrodiaetus) fulgens, sensu lato.

Polyommatus
Butterflies of Europe
Butterflies described in 1925